Mohamad Syaqir bin Sulaiman (born 12 August 1986) is a Singaporean footballer.

Career
As a teenager, Sulaiman overheard his parents discussing how he was the least likely of his three siblings to make it to university. After writing "You can do it. I’m going to prove father wrong" in his cupboard, Sulaiman was motivated to do well in his studies and eventually enrolled in Nanyang Technological University. While attending university, he played as a professional footballer in the Singaporean top flight and coached at two schools.

References

External links
 Syaqir Sulaiman at National Football Teams

Singaporean footballers
Living people
1986 births
Association football midfielders
Association football defenders
Singapore international footballers